The 90mm gun tank T42 was a medium tank powered by the AOS-895-3, a 6-cylinder, air cooled, opposed cylinder, supercharged engine displacing 895.9 cubic inches. It was intended to fulfill OTCM 32529's, dated December 2, 1948, call for a tank weighing 36 tons and equivalently armed as the M46 while having superior armour. With an engine producing only 500 hp, concern about the T42's performance was expressed.  Testing, with a T40 loaded to the weight of T42 and powered by the AOS-895 through a CD-500 transmission, revealed it to be only equivalent in performance to the late model M4A3, which was below the design estimates.

Development
The prototype vehicles were sent to testing fitted with an upgraded AOS-895-3 engine and CD-500-3 transmission. Some of the steel parts were replaced with aluminum making the T42 lighter by 500 pounds (227 kg). With the improved performance it was able to pass the original specifications but the Army Field Forces refused its adoption as still underpowered development shifted to the M47 and T48 (later M48) programs.

Variants
 T69: armed with a 90mm T178 in an oscillating turret with an autoloader
 T87: proposed improvement of the T42 including features such as a cast steel elliptical hull and a flat track suspension

References

Bibliography
 

Cold War tanks of the United States